Pleasant Valley is an unincorporated community in Marshall County, West Virginia, United States. It was also known as Beeler Station.

The name is commendatory.

References 

Unincorporated communities in West Virginia
Unincorporated communities in Marshall County, West Virginia